Ectopsocus thibaudi is a species of outer barklouse in the family Ectopsocidae. It is found in the Caribbean Sea, Central America, North America, and South America.

References

Ectopsocidae
Articles created by Qbugbot
Insects described in 1979